Impatiens flaccida is a species of flowering plant native to the Western Ghats in India and to Sri Lanka. They root at the lower nodes.

The plant has naturalized on the islands of Mauritius and Réunion.

Notes

flaccida
Flora of India (region)
Flora of Sri Lanka
Plants described in 1836